The Columbia Political Review is Columbia University's undergraduate multi-partisan political magazine. The Columbia Political Review is the official publication of the Columbia Political Union, the largest political organization on campus. The Columbia Political Review features articles on domestic and international issues, and interviews with political leaders and academics. It is published four times per academic year, with a Fall, Winter, Spring and Summer issue.

Founding
The Columbia Political Review was created in 2001 by leaders of the Columbia Political Union, including its General Manager, Yoni Appelbaum, and its Publisher, Jaime Sneider. The first managing editor was Adam B. Kushner. The early magazine featured book reviews, personal essays, opinion pieces, in-depth analysis and interviews with an influential figure. It sought to foster political discussion on campus and become a platform for diverse opinion. It was published two to three times a semester. The Columbia Political Review saw its largest period of growth between 2001 and 2007, when circulation grew to 4,500.

Alumni
 Yoni Appelbaum, politics editor of The Atlantic
 Chris Beam, founder IvyGate
 Matthew Continetti, editor of The Washington Free Beacon
 Adam B. Kushner, editor of the Outlook section of The Washington Post
 Rob Saliterman, former spokesman for former President George W. Bush
 Paul Sonne, Moscow Correspondent The Wall Street Journal
 Marc Tracy, sports reporter for The New York Times

See also
 The Brown Spectator
 Brown Political Review
 The Stanford Review
 Berkeley Political Review
 Harvard Political Review

References

External links
Columbia Political Review online
Columbia Political Union online

Columbia University publications
Magazines established in 2001
Magazines published in New York City
Quarterly magazines published in the United States
Political magazines published in the United States